Başovacık can refer to:

 Başovacık, Aziziye
 Başovacık, Kurşunlu